Claudio Oscar Marangoni (born 17 November 1954 in Rosario) is an Argentine former footballer who played as a midfielder. He played club football in Argentina and England and played for the Argentina national team at international level.

Biography
Marangoni started his playing career in 1974 with Chacarita Juniors he then joined San Lorenzo de Almagro in 1976.

In 1979, he joined Sunderland A.F.C. of England where he failed to settle, his contract was terminated in 1980 and he returned to Argentina.

Marangoni played one season for Huracán before joining Club Atlético Independiente in 1982. He won three major titles with the club, the 1983 Metropolitano followed by the Copa Libertadores and Copa Intercontinental in 1984.

In 1988, he left Independiente to join Boca Juniors where he won a further two international tournaments, the Supercopa Sudamericana 1989 and the Recopa Sudamericana 1990.

Upon retirement, Marangoni started Escuela Modelo de Futbol y Deportes, the first-ever professional soccer schools and sports clinics for Argentina's youth.

The schools serve children from age 3-13 and are franchised throughout the country, serving public and private schools, community centers, country clubs and businesses. Integral to the company's model is free tuition for underprivileged children. Since selection, he expanded his training schools to Chile and Spain.

His work was recognized by Endeavor (non-profit) and he was selected as an Endeavor Entrepreneur in 1999. Endeavor is a global non-profit that selects and supports High-Impact Entrepreneurship in emerging markets.

Honours
 Independiente
Primera División (1): 1983 Metropolitano
Copa Libertadores (1): 1984
Intercontinental Cup (1): 1984

 Boca Juniors
Supercopa Libertadores (1): 1989
Recopa Sudamericana (1): 1990

References

External links

 Marangoni's biography
 San Lorenzo micro profile
Endeavor Profile on Claudio Marangoni

1954 births
Living people
Footballers from Rosario, Santa Fe
Argentine people of Italian descent
Argentine footballers
Argentina international footballers
1983 Copa América players
Association football midfielders
Chacarita Juniors footballers
San Lorenzo de Almagro footballers
Club Atlético Huracán footballers
Club Atlético Independiente footballers
Boca Juniors footballers
Sunderland A.F.C. players
English Football League players
Argentine expatriate sportspeople in England
Argentine Primera División players
Argentine expatriate footballers
Expatriate footballers in England